Going Home was a drama television series produced by the SBS network in Australia that aired from 2000 to 2001.

Scripted, filmed, edited and broadcast on the same day, Going Home was set in a nightly inter-urban commuter train. A group of regular train travelers are featured on their daily commute in a blend of up-to-the-minute commentary on the news and events of the day, together with the unfolding dramas in their lives. Viewer feedback was encouraged, including plot and character suggestions that were regularly incorporated into subsequent episodes.

Towards the very end of the 2001 season, we see Australian character actor Stuart Rawe, before Swift and Shift Couriers, in one of his very early roles as a "Silent Football Fan".

Actress Rhonda Doyle is best known for playing “Jan” in the infamous Yellow Pages commercial with the quote “Not happy, Jan”.

The concept has been used later in other countries: in Canada (Train 48), in France (Le train - The train) and in Italy (Andata e Ritorno - Roundtrip).

See also 
 List of Australian television series

External links 
 Australian Television Information Archive
 

Australian comedy television series
Australian drama television series
Special Broadcasting Service original programming
2000 Australian television series debuts
2001 Australian television series endings